Billy Glide (July 25, 1970 - May 24, 2014) was a pornographic actor. He began appearing in adult films around 1995 and appeared in over 1300 movies.

Personal life
Billy Glide was born Tad Douglas Nolen in Los Angeles, California, United States. He started his career in 1995. Nolen died on 24 May 2014 in Huntington Beach, California. It was initially reported that he had been bitten by a rattlesnake, while helping a friend move, and had refused medical treatment. However, it was later confirmed that, although he had suffered a venomous bite, the actual cause of death was alcohol intoxication. Glide never married but left behind a daughter at the time of his death.

Glide was posthumously inducted into the AVN Hall of Fame in 2015.

Awards
1999 AVN Award winner – Best Group Sex Scene, Film – The Masseuse 3
 2015 AVN Hall of Fame inductee.

References

External links 
 
 
 

1970 births
2014 deaths
American male pornographic film actors
Pornographic film actors from California
Male actors from Los Angeles
Alcohol-related deaths in California
Sex workers drug-related deaths